This is a list of festivals and parades in Montreal, Quebec, Canada. This list includes festivals of diverse types, such as regional festivals, commerce festivals, fairs, food festivals, arts festivals, religious festivals, folk festivals, and recurring festivals on holidays.

Festivals

Black and Blue Festival gay Circuit party and AIDS research fundraiser
Blue Metropolis The Montreal International Literary Festival
Festival SOIR, festival pop up multidisciplinaire
Fierté Montréal Pride celebrations
Just for Laughs comedy festival
L'International des Feux Loto-Québec - International fireworks competition
Montreal High Lights Festival
The People's Games
St-Ambroise Montreal Fringe Festival

Culture festivals
Matsuri Japon festival
Montreal's Italian Week
Jamaica Day
Romani Yag, a Roma/gypsy cultural and musical festival
Trinidad Day

Film and stage festivals
Fantasia Festival Genre films festival
iF3 International Freeski Film Festival 
Montreal International Festival of New Cinema and New Media
Montreal World Film Festival
Otakuthon, a Japanese animation convention/festival
Rencontres internationales du documentaire de Montreal

Food festivals
Mondial de la Bière, one of North America's largest beer festivals
Montreal Vegan Festival

Music festivals

Amnesia Rockfest, for rock, punk, ska and alternative music
Festival Bach Montréal, 
FestiBlues international de Montréal, for blues music
Heavy MTL, for heavy metal and hard rock music
Igloofest, wintertime outdoor music festival
île Soniq, EDM festival
Les FrancoFolies de Montréal, French-language music
Montreal Electronic Groove (MEG) festival, for electronic music
Montreal Jazz Festival, for jazz music
Montreal Reggae Festival, for reggae music
Mutek, electronic and avant-garde music festival
Osheaga, music festival held annually at Parc Jean-Drapeau
Piknic Électronik, weekly summertime house music festival
Pop Montreal, indie-rock festival
UnPop Montreal indie-rock festival
Vans Warped Tour, for punk rock music

Pop culture festivals
Montreal Comiccon

Parades in Montreal
 
Montreal's St. Patrick's Day parade and the Irish in Quebec Montreal's is the oldest St. Patrick's Day Parade in Canada and one of the largest parades in Montreal.
Greek Independence Day Parade on Hutchison in Jean Talon, it happens right after the St. Patrick's Day Festival. First celebrated on March 25, 1821, this parade gathers numerous Greek schools such as Socrates, and Demostenes for example, and the church groups and the different provinces from Greece, such as the Ionian Islands, the Cyclades and many more. It's expressed as the day that Greece marks its independence from the Ottoman Empire.
Fête nationale du Québec parade
Canada Day Parade, celebrating Canada's birthday
Carifiesta Montreal, a Parade celebrating the Caribbean culture of Montreal
Twins Parade, a parade hosted by Just For Laughs Festival
Fierté Montréal, celebrating Montréal's LGBTQ+ community, every third sunday of August.
Santa Claus parade

See also

 List of festivals in Quebec 
 List of festivals in Canada
 Lists of festivals by city 
Culture of Montreal
Tourism in Montreal

External links

and
andList
Montreal
Montreal-related lists